Phymorhynchus alberti is a species of sea snail, a marine gastropod mollusk in the family Raphitomidae.

Description
The length of the shell attains 66 mm, its diameter 3 mm.

The large, white shell is extremely thin and fragile. It consists of 7 convex whorls, slightly flattened upwards. The shell shows longitudinally flattened folds that become, at the base of the body whorl, decurrent ribs that also remain superficial. The aperture is large, measuring half the total length of the shell. It is angular at the top and slightly retracted at its base, forming an open, very short siphonal canal. The columella is slightly bent and twisted and shows a shining callus. The outer lip is simple and sharp. It shows on top a large and rather deep sinus.

Distribution
This marine species occurs off the Cape Verdes.

References

 Sysoev A.V. (2014). Deep-sea fauna of European seas: An annotated species check-list of benthic invertebrates living deeper than 2000 m in the seas bordering Europe. Gastropoda. Invertebrate Zoology. Vol.11. No.1: 134–155 
 Gofas, S.; Le Renard, J.; Bouchet, P. (2001). Mollusca. in: Costello, M.J. et al. (eds), European Register of Marine Species: a check-list of the marine species in Europe and a bibliography of guides to their identification. Patrimoines Naturels. 50: 180–213.

External links
 

alberti
Gastropods described in 1906